Malvar, officially the Municipality of Malvar,  is a 2nd class municipality in the province of Batangas, Philippines.

The municipality was named after General Miguel Malvar, one of the last Filipino generals to surrender to the Americans during the Philippine-American War in 1902. The Municipality comprises 15 barangays and 3 sitios.

With the expansion of Metro Manila, Malvar is now part of the Manila conurbation (which reaches Lipa City).

History

According to Ferdinand Blumentritt who wrote many articles about Philippine history which were published in Boletin de la Sociedad Geografica in Madrid, Spain in 1866, Malvar's history dates back to 1300 AD when Datu Puti, a member of the Ten Datus who escaped from Sultan Makatunao of Borneo, settled in what is now the province of Batangas. His descendants inhabited Laguna, Cavite, Bicol Region, and in our place, then known as Luta.

Luta was formerly a barrio of the Municipality of Lipa, now Lipa City. When Luta was created to become an independent municipality, it included the adjoining barrios of Payapa, Kalikangan, San Gallo, and Bilukaw. As time went by, these original barrios were divided and were given other names. Payapa was divided and became San Fernando, Santiago, and Bagong Pook. Kalikakan became the barrios of San Andres and San Juan. San Gallo became the barrios of San Pioquinto, San Pedro (including Sitio Calejon) and Bilucaw became San Isidro and Bilucao. These names given to each barrio were based on the names of the locality's most powerful or honored man.

Luta retained its name perhaps due to its exciting and very memorable legend. It was said that the name Luta came from the name of a beautiful maiden, Dayang-Dayang, the youngest daughter of Datu Banga, a descendant of Datu Puti, then the chief of the tribe.

She was the most beautiful lady in the place. Loved and cherished by the inhabitants, she fell in love with a Chinese named Ling and was about to be married when her elder sister Kampupot took interest in her fiancé. Out of the treachery and jealousy of her sister, Luta was executed and died in the arms of her Chinese lover. From then on, the place was named Luta in her honor.

Luta's march toward becoming a municipality could never be ignored. For this is where the seeds and the sentiments of becoming one were sown. This is where the Samahang Mag-aararo, the acknowledged pioneers of this movement was organized. They were Mariano R. Lat, Gregorio Leviste, Miguel L. Aranda, Simeon Esleigue, Constancio Manalo, Pedro Lat-Torres, Nicasio Gutierrez, Gregorio Villapando, Estanislaw Lat, Pelagio Wagan, Sebastian Trinidad and Julian Lantin. Through its dynamic organizers and members, the first steps to make the locality a municipality were made. It was in Luta where the seat of the Municipal Government was situated.

With their (The Samahang Mag-aararo) devotion, patience, and perseverance and with the help of the Honorable Teodoro M. Kalaw, former Secretary of the Interior, Malvar was finally created a municipality by a proclamation by the acting Governor-General of the Philippines Honorable Charles B. Yeater, on the 16th day of December 1918. The proclamation took effect on January 10, 1919, on the same day the municipality was inaugurated.

In honor of the late General Miguel Malvar, the town was named the last Filipino general to surrender to the Americans.

Luta was Malvar's old name before it became a municipality.

Geography

According to the Philippine Statistics Authority, the municipality has a land area of  constituting  of the  total area of Batangas.

Barangays
Malvar is politically subdivided into 15 barangays.

Climate

Demographics

In the 2020 census, Malvar had a population of 64,379.

Economy

Government

List of chief executive
 Gregorio Leviste: 1919-1922
 Simeon Esleigue: 1922-1924
 Julio Leviste: 1924-1930
 Benito Leviste: 1930–1939, 1945-1950
 Trinidad Leviste: 1939-1941
 Angel Leviste: 1941-1942
 Fidel Leviste: 1942-1944
 Eustacio Endaya: 1944-1945,1968-1980
 Benito Leviste: 1930–1939, 1945-1950
 Pedro Lat: 1951-1955
 Pedro Montecer: 1955-1959
 Isabelo Navarro: 1960-1967
 Eustacio Endaya: 1944-1945,1968-1980
 Fermin Malabanan: 1980
 Maximo Reyes: 1980-1986
 Patricio Villegas: 1986-1998
 Teodora Villegas: 1998-2001
 Cristeta C. Reyes: 2001-2010
 Carlito D. Reyes, MD: 2010-2016
 Cristeta C. Reyes: 2016-2018
 Alberto C. Lat: 2018-2019
 Cristeta C. Reyes: 2019–present

Education

 Bagong Pook Elementary School (Bagong Pook)
 Batangas State University (Poblacion)
 Bilucao Elementary School (Bilucao)
 Bulihan Elementary School(Bulihan)
 Don Julio Leviste Memorial Vocational High School (San Andres)
 Immaculate Conception Montessori School (Poblacion)
 Luta Elementary School (Luta Sur)
 Malvar Central School (Poblacion)
 Malvar School of Arts and Trade (Poblacion)
 Miguel L. Aranda Memorial Elementary School (San Andres)
 Mother Hand Educational School (Poblacion)
 OB Montessori School (Sanpioquinto)
 Payapa Elementary School (Santiago)
 San Fernando Elementary School
 San Isidro National High School (San Isidro)
 San Pedro 1 Primary School
 San Pedro Elementary School (San Pedro)
 Sanpioquinto Elementary School (Sanpioquinto)
 Santiago National High School (Santiago)
 Southgate Institute of Malvar (Poblacion)

Health
Apart from the primary Rural Health Unit under DOH-Batangas, Mayor Carlito Reyes founded the Malvar Maternity Clinic a month after taking office. The clinic accepts emergency deliveries and is open 24 hours daily for obstetric and other immediate health services. The clinic has doctors on duty from 7 am to 11 pm on weekdays and around the clock on weekends. RHU personnel serve during the day. Nurses are on duty 24 hours daily, and a midwife is on duty on weeknights. An ambulance is available for patient transfers, and all services are free of charge.

Tourism

Calejon Falls, in Barangay San Gregorio (formerly known as Calejon), consists of two large waterfalls and two smaller ones. One of the smaller falls is shower-like, while the other forms a series of small cascades.

The falls are located at the STAR Tollway Bulihan exit. From Manila, buses to Batangas City or Lipa City stop at Malvar. Jeepneys and tricycle service are also available from the town. The  stretch of road is smoothly paved. There are 300 concrete steps down the river at the falls.

The San Juan River, the longest river in Batangas, connects Lipa, and Tanauan and Santo Tomas and is a water source for vegetable and fish farms.

A recently emerged local attraction in the area is a mango farm known as Sa Manggahan. Forty-five minutes away from Alabang, it is near the C-Joist Concrete Ventures Group plant. The country's third Thoroughbred race track (Metro Manila Turf Club Race Track) is in the municipality, as are the Immaculate Conception Parish Church of Malvar and the Miguel Malvar Monument at the Municipal Hall Grounds. The fiesta is celebrated every January 10.

Malvar is slowly establishing its reputation as a conference center in Batangas. In February 2013, the Lima Park Pavilion opened to the public with a concert by the Madrigal Singers. With a capacity of 1,000 the Lima Park Pavilion and Lima Park Hotel are located in Malvar's industrial park, the Lima Technology Center.

Landmarks
 Batangas State University - Jose P. Laurel Polytechnic College
 Immaculate Conception Parish Church of Malvar
 Metro Manila Turf Club Race Track
 Miguel Malvar Monument

Notable personalities
 Governor Feliciano Leviste - politician; Batangas governor (1947-1972)
 Governor Jose Antonio Leviste - politician; Batangas governor (1972-1980)
 Rey Publico - basketball player
 Admiral Artemio Abu - Commandant of the Philippine Coast Guard

See also
 Batangas State University Jose P. Laurel Polytechnic College

References

External links

[ Philippine Standard Geographic Code]

Municipalities of Batangas